Exclusive Session may refer to:

 Exclusive Session (Placebo EP), 2007
 Exclusive Session (Tori Amos EP), 2005